The large moth family Crambidae contains the following genera beginning with "J":

References 

 J
Crambid